Nimr, al-Nimr or NIMR may refer to:

People
 Ali Mohammed Baqir al-Nimr (born 1994), Saudi Arabian protestor sentenced to beheading and crucifixion, but later released, nephew of Nimr al-Nimr
 Amy Nimr (1898–1974), Egyptian-born artist, writer and patron of the arts
 Faris Nimr (1856–1951), Lebanese journalist
 Khaled Nimr (born 1978), Jordanian footballer
 Mek Nimr (died 1846), last mek (king) of the Ja'alin tribe of Shendi, Sudan
 Nimr al-Nimr (1959–2016), Saudi Arabian Shia cleric beheaded for criticizing his country's government
 Sonia Nimr (born 1955), Palestinian writer, storyteller, translator, ethnographer and academic

Other uses
 NIMR (vehicle manufacturer)
 Nimr (armored personnel carrier)
 National Institute for Medical Research, in the UK
 National Institute of Malaria Research, in India
 Nigerian Institute of Medical Research, in Nigeria

See also
 Al-Nimr Palace, in Nablus, West Bank
 Albu Nimr, a Sunni Arab tribe in Iraq

Arabic masculine given names